Khirbat Bayt Far was a Palestinian village in the Ramle Subdistrict of Mandatory Palestine, located 14 km south of Ramla.  It was depopulated during the 1947–48 Civil War in Mandatory Palestine on April 7, 1948.

History
Ceramics from the Byzantine era have been found here.

Ottoman era
In 1838, in the late  Ottoman era, it was noted as a village in ruins.

In 1863 Victor Guérin noted "important ruins" here. "There once stood a hamlet, the ruins of which are scattered over a feeble mound amid the bushes and tall grass."

In 1882, the PEF's Survey of Western Palestine (SWP)  found here: "Walls and foundations, apparently modern, with caves and a spring."

British Mandate era
In the 1922 census of Palestine conducted by the British Mandate authorities,  Bait Far had a population of 28 Muslims,  decreasing in the 1931 census to 26  Muslims, in a total of 11 houses.

In the 1945 statistics  the village had a population of 300 Muslims with a total of 5,604  dunums of land.  Of this, 19 dunums  were for plantations and irrigable land, 5,337 dunums were for cereals,  while  a total of 248 dunams were classified as non-cultivable areas.

1948, aftermath
On 11 January 1948,  Kfar Uriah was attacked by Arabs who came from neighboring Beit Jiz
and Khirbet Beit Far.

In 1948, Beyt Pe'er  was founded on village land, it later changed its name into Tal Shahar.

In 1992 the village site was described: "All that is left of the village are debris and girders heaped together in a small area. The site is ringed by carob trees.  The remains of an uprooted olive grove lies to the north and east."

References

Bibliography

 
 

  

 

  (p.  376)

External links
 Welcome To Bayt Far, Khirbat, Palestine Remembered
 Khirbat Bayt Far,   Zochrot
Survey of Western Palestine, Map 16:   IAA, Wikimedia commons  

Arab villages depopulated during the 1948 Arab–Israeli War
District of Ramla